An election to Kerry County Council took place on 20 June 1985 as part of that year's Irish local elections. 27 councillors were elected from five electoral divisions by PR-STV voting.

Results by party

Results by Electoral Area

Killarney

Killorglin

Listowel

Mid-Kerry

Tralee

External links

1985 Irish local elections
1985